Kathleen LaNatra is a State Representative who represents the 12th Plymouth District in the Massachusetts House of Representatives. She represents the towns of Duxbury, Halifax, Kingston, Plymouth,  and Plympton. LaNatra serves on the House Committee on Technology and Intergovernmental Affairs, the Joint Committee on Economic Development and Emerging Technologies, the Joint Committee on Elder Affairs, and the Joint Committee on Election Laws.

See also
 2019–2020 Massachusetts legislature
 2021–2022 Massachusetts legislature

References

Living people
21st-century American women politicians
21st-century American politicians
Women state legislators in Massachusetts
Democratic Party members of the Massachusetts House of Representatives
People from Kingston, Massachusetts
Year of birth missing (living people)